Pishkuh or Pish Kuh may refer to:
 Pish Kuh-e Pain, Gilan Province
 Pishkuh Rural District (disambiguation)
 Pishkuh-e Mugui Rural District